= Gambling in Saudi Arabia =

Gambling is illegal in the Kingdom of Saudi Arabia. Punishments for gambling in the country vary from fines, imprisonment, and confiscation of assets.

== Prevalence ==
Since gambling is illegal in the Middle East and North African countries, the people from these regions have looked for gambling opportunities within the region and also in the West and the Far East regions.

King Faisal was concerned over the KSA's future king, Fahd's gambling problem. In 1962, some people witnessed Fahd at a hotel in Monte Carlo to have lost a significant amount of money, about £7 million. Following this news, Faisal asked Fahd to return to Riyadh. Nevertheless, Fahd continued gambling.

In 1990, Sheik Eynani, an adviser to Prince Faisal, lost $12.4 million in just four nights between June 15 - July 15 while gambling at clubs in Cannes and Monte Carlo.

In 2001, Saudi police arrested 3 Indians after raiding a gambling club in Riyadh, which was electronically connected to a casino in Taiwan.

In 2018, 16 expatriates hailing from Bangladesh were arrested for gambling inside house in Makkah.

== Laws ==
Gambling and lottery are illegal in Saudi Arabia. Punishments for gambling in the country vary from fines, imprisonment, and confiscation of assets.

As of 2024, the country has increased the basic fines for every illegal gambling device, used for on-site gambling, ranging from $26,753 to $107,015.

== Online gambling ==
The KSA uses a high-end blocking mechanism to prevent people from accessing online gambling services. Nevertheless, some people still have access to online gambling. The VPNs are frequently used for this activity.
